Reticunassa erythraea is a species of sea snail, a marine gastropod mollusk in the family Nassariidae, the Nassa mud snails or dog whelks.

Description
The shell size varies between 4.5 mm and 9 mm

Distribution
This species occurs in the Red Sea and in the Indian Ocean off Madagascar.

References

 Dautzenberg, Ph. (1929). Mollusques testacés marins de Madagascar. Faune des Colonies Francaises, Tome III

External links
 
 Issel, A. (1869). Malacologia del Mar Rosso. Ricerche zoologiche e paleontologiche. Biblioteca Malacologica, Pisa. xi + 387 pp., pls 1-5.
 Galindo L.A., Kool H.H. & Dekker H. (2017). Review of the Nassarius pauperus (Gould, 1850) complex (Nassariidae): Part 3, reinstatement of the genus Reticunassa, with the description of six new species. European Journal of Taxonomy. 275: 1-43

erythraea
Gastropods described in 1869